Archichlora is a genus of moths in the family Geometridae described by Warren in 1898.

Species
The African species of this genus are:

Archichlora alophias Herbulot, 1954
Archichlora altivagans Herbulot, 1960
Archichlora ambrimontis Herbulot, 1960
Archichlora andranobe Viette, 1978
Archichlora ankalirano Viette, 1975
Archichlora ansorgei (Warren, 1901)
Archichlora antanosa Herbulot, 1960
Archichlora bevilany Viette, 1978
Archichlora chariessa Prout, 1925
Archichlora devoluta (Walker, 1861)
Archichlora engenes Prout, 1922
Archichlora epicydra Prout, 1938
Archichlora florilimbata Herbulot, 1960
Archichlora griveaudi Viette, 1978
Archichlora hemistrigata (Mabille, 1900)
Archichlora herbuloti Viette, 1978
Archichlora ioannis Herbulot, 1954
Archichlora jacksoni Carcasson, 1971
Archichlora majuscula Herbulot, 1960
Archichlora marcescens Warren, 1904
Archichlora marginata (Warren, 1902)
Archichlora monodi Viette, 1975
Archichlora nigricosta Herbulot, 1960
Archichlora pavonina Herbulot, 1960
Archichlora petroselina Herbulot, 1960
Archichlora phyllobrota (Holland, 1920)
Archichlora povolnyi Viette, 1975
Archichlora pulveriplaga (Warren, 1898)
Archichlora rectilineata Carcasson, 1971
Archichlora sangoana Carcasson, 1971
Archichlora soa Viette, 1971
Archichlora sola Herbulot, 1960
Archichlora stellicincta Herbulot, 1972
Archichlora subrubescens Herbulot, 1960
Archichlora triangularia (C. Swinhoe, 1904)
Archichlora tricycla Herbulot, 1960
Archichlora trygodes Prout, 1922
Archichlora vieui Herbulot, 1960
Archichlora viridicrossa Herbulot, 1960
Archichlora viridimacula Warren, 1898 - type species

References

Geometrinae
Geometridae genera